Cis-acting replication elements bring together the 5′ and 3′ ends during replication of positive-sense single-stranded RNA viruses (for example Picornavirus, Flavivirus, coronavirus, togaviruses, Hepatitis C virus) and double-stranded RNA viruses (for example rotavirus and reovirus).

See also
Cis-regulatory element
List of cis-regulatory RNA elements
Enterovirus cis-acting replication element and Enterovirus 5′ cloverleaf cis-acting replication element
Cardiovirus cis-acting replication element (CRE)
Coronavirus SL-III cis-acting replication element (CRE)
Rotavirus cis-acting replication element
Hepatitis C virus cis-acting replication element
Flavivirus 3′ UTR cis-acting replication element (CRE)
Potato virus X cis-acting regulatory element
Human rhinovirus internal cis-acting regulatory element (CRE)

References

RNA